Brtonigla (Venetian: Vertenejo) is a village and a municipality in the north-western part of Istria County, Croatia. Brtonigla is officially bilingual, with Croatian and Italian being equal; in 2011, 40% of the population declared themselves as ethnic Italians.

Physical geography 

Brtonigla/Verteneglio was formerly part of the municipality of Buje, which is immediately north, and is bordered to the south by the River Quieto. The old town of Brtonigla originally was placed on top of a hill, but over time it extended to its sides, occupying the entire hill. The area is suitable for agriculture. Wine, grain, corn, oil and vegetables are produced there. The nearest seaside resort is Karigador.
The summers are long and dry, while the winters are mild and pleasing.

History 
Brtonigla was mentioned for the first time in 1234, with the ancient name Ortoneglo or Hortus Niger, i.e. black ground garden.

In the 11th century Venetians settled in the area, and in the 16th and 17th century Dalmatian and Balkan peasant families settled there too. Vertenejo was part of the Serenissima Republic of Venice and then of the Austro-Hungarian Empire, with the brief parenthesis of the Napoleonic Kingdom of Italy. After the First World War and then the Treaty of Rapallo, the village became part of Italy, a period in which Verteneglio knew its maximum demographic and economic development. After the Second World War it was included in Zone B of the Free Territory of Trieste. With the cession of Zone B to Yugoslavia, most of the Italian population abandoned the village, by then known as Brtonigla. Since 1991, Brtonigla is a municipality in the Istria County of the Republic of Croatia.

Coat of arms 
The municipal symbol became official for the first time during the period of Italian sovereignty (1920-1945). The symbol then consisted of an oval frame enclosing a green field crossed by two dark red streets crossing the center of the coat of arms and the sea (towards the lower part of the coat of arms). The coat of arms that is used since the independence of Croatia perfectly copies the old coat of arms except the sea that has been moved upward. Everything is enclosed in a white frame.

Monuments

 Church of San Zenone: the parish church of Brtonigla is dedicated to San Zenone, Bishop of Verona and patron of the town. The ceiling of the church is flat, the polygonal apse, and the side walls are decorated with marble altars made according to neo-baroque principles. On the yellow, there are two large windows on the sides. Above the entrance is a tall red bell tower, and at the sides of the roof there are two small spiers. The church was built between 1859 and 1861 on the foundations of the oldest homonymous church dating back to 1480.

It is named after the small river Scarlini, which flows into the river Quieto. Inside the park the stream lying in a small basin forms a long green pond.

Society

Languages and dialects
The municipality is bilingual; Brtonigla/Verteneglio is in fact the second Istrian mucipality, after Grožnjan/Grisignana, in terms of percentage of Italian-speaking inhabitants. Until before the exodus, the population of Italian ethnicity was between 98 and 100% of the total.

In 2001, Brtonigla/Verteneglio hosted 52.82% Croatian-speakers, 41.29% Italian-speakers, 2.47% Slovenian-speakers and 1.52% Albanian-speakers

In 2011, Brtonigla/Verteneglio hosted 54% Croatian-speakers, 39.79% Italian-speakers, 2.28% Slovenian-speakers and 0.43% Albanian-speakers

According to the 2011 census, municipality of Brtonigla/Verteneglio had 1.626 residents.

Religions

Settlements 

The municipality includes several settlements:
Brtonigla - Verteneglio, population 805
 Fiorini, population 165
Karigador - Carigador, population 189
Nova Vas - Villanova del Quieto, population 359
 Radini, population 108

Notable residents 
 Giovanni Craglietto (1889 Verteneglio - 1975 Trieste), painter and drawer

Twin towns
Brtonigla/Verteneglio is twinned with:
  Greve in Chianti, Italy

See also
 Istralandia
 Karigador

References

External links

Municipalities of Croatia
Populated places in Istria County
Italian-speaking territorial units in Croatia